Ruby National Forest was established by the U.S. Forest Service in the Ruby Mountains of northeast Nevada on June 19, 1912 with  transferred from part of Humboldt National Forest and other lands. On July 1, 1917 the entire forest was transferred back to Humboldt and the name was discontinued. The lands are presently part of the Ruby Mountains District of Humboldt-Toiyabe National Forest.

See also
Ruby Mountains National Forest

References

External links
Forest History Society
Listing of the National Forests of the United States and Their Dates (from the Forest History Society website) Text from Davis, Richard C., ed. Encyclopedia of American Forest and Conservation History. New York: Macmillan Publishing Company for the Forest History Society, 1983. Vol. II, pp. 743-788.

Ruby Mountains
Former National Forests of Nevada
Protected areas of Elko County, Nevada
Protected areas of White Pine County, Nevada
Humboldt–Toiyabe National Forest